Quakers Hill is a suburb of Sydney, in the state of New South Wales, Australia. It is  westnorth-west (WNW) of the Sydney central business district, in the local government area of the City of Blacktown. Quakers Hill is part of the Greater Western Sydney region. Quakers Hill is colloquially known as 'Quakers'.

History
The first recorded cartographic use in NSW of the 'Quaker' name is that of "Quaker's Row", today's Church Street, Parramatta. In November 1788 a second settlement was established by Governor Phillip at Rose Hill and was renamed in June 1791, Parramatta. In July 1790 he laid out his plan for the town, with High Street (now George) the main road with another (143 feet / 43.6 m wide) starting at the south bank of the river where Phillip intended a town square with government buildings and an extended wharf. This he named Quakers Row.

Alan Sharpe, in his "Pictorial History Blacktown and District" (referenced below) on page 84 has no mention of the historic town plan of July 1790.

Development at Parramatta was swift, with the Rev Samuel Marsden establishing conformist religious services. The Quaker's Row inhabitants were moved further west to The Quaker's Hills, where they re-established themselves. It is said they were responsible for burying the dead in simple cairn marked graves that lay in the fields, paddocks and creeks who were all victims of the 1804 uprising and rebellion.

The name Quakers Hill was in an 1806 report of the area by government surveyor James Meehan. The origin of the name is unclear and the next references are more than sixty years later when Thomas Harvey used it for his property in what is now western Quakers Hill. When the railway station was built in 1872, it was called Douglas' Siding for over thirty years. The catalyst for the name change came with the subdivision of Harvey's Quakers Hill property in 1904. The residents of the newly forming village preferred that name and in 1905, the name of the railway station was changed to Quakers Hill.

Postal services began in 1907 and the first post office was built in 1915. A school opened in the Presbyterian church hall in what is now Marayong in 1911 and Quakers Hill Public School took its first students in 1912. During the 1920s, the population grew dramatically, a number of shops opened in the area around the station and a public hall, the Empire Theatre, opened in 1925, screening movies and hosting dances. The village became a centre for the surrounding farms.

In the 1960s, Sydney's suburban sprawl reached the Quakers Hill area and the five acre farms surrounding the village began to be subdivided. In 1994, HMAS Nirimba, a naval training property on the western side of the suburb, was decommissioned and converted into an educational precinct. In 1996, a new development in the north-east of Quakers Hill was converted into a new suburb, Acacia Gardens. In November 2020, the small portion of the suburb north of Quakers Hill Parkway became part of the new suburb of Nirimba Fields.

Nursing home fire
On 18 November 2011, an early morning fire at Quakers Hill Nursing Home killed 11 elderly residents, seriously injured others and caused the evacuation of up to 100 people. Three people died in the fire, and a further eight residents of the home died later in hospital from their injuries. The fire started in two places and was regarded by police as suspicious.

Aftermath 
A nurse working in the home, 36-year-old Roger Kingsley Dean, was later arrested and charged with four counts of murder. He was later charged over more subsequent deaths. On 2 November 2012 the accused pleaded not guilty to eight counts of recklessly causing grievous bodily harm and eleven counts of murder. He had wished to plead guilty to manslaughter, but that was rejected by the Crown. He did plead guilty to two larceny charges relating to theft of prescription painkillers from the nursing home. He stood trial in the Supreme Court in May 2013. On 27 May 2013, Dean pleaded guilty to eleven counts of murder, and on 1 August 2013 he was sentenced to life imprisonment without the possibility of parole.

In September 2014, an inquest into the deaths opened, and its results were released on 9 March 2015. After finding that the nursing home operators Domain Principal Group (now known as Opal Aged Care) didn't look into Dean's past before employment, Hugh Dillon, the NSW deputy coroner recommended: a database of healthcare workers be created with details of their background; that workers be trained to recognise signs of co-workers abusing drugs; and that nursing home door and corridors be constructed to allow beds to be moved rapidly during emergencies. Dillon also suggested that two fire-fighters receive bravery awards.

 Opal Aged Care has 69 homes in Australia.
It was finished in 2017.

Transport 
Public Transport to and from Quakers Hill is provided by train and a number of bus services by Busways, namely routes: 731 (outskirts), 732 (west), 734 (outskirts), 745 (all over), 752 (all over) and 753 (south). Quakers Hill railway station is on the Richmond branch of the North Shore & Western Line of the Sydney Trains network. Bus services connect to Sydney Metro network at Tallawong, Rouse Hill and Bella Vista stations.

Quakers Hill has experienced much road development over recent years including the construction of a new road leading directly to the education precinct, bypassing the town centre. The Westlink M7, which links the suburb directly to all major routes in and out of the greater Sydney region, opened in December 2005. Following this opening the road overpass for the Quakers Hill Parkway has been widened from two to four lanes, including the bridge over the railway line, improving toll-free traffic flow between Richmond and Sunnyholt Roads.

Housing 
Quakers Hill has a blend of old and new developments. There are some Housing Commission Houses (Public Housing) on the older (southern) side of Quakers Hill, mainly near Marayong. The western side of the railway line predominantly has houses on standard residential blocks, some built when HMAS Nirimba was an active naval base, others through the 1960s and 1970s. The eastern side of the railway line consists of dwellings constructed since the 1980s, with a high proportion of high density homes or townhouses.

Education 
Quakers Hill is home to numerous schools and educational institutions. The oldest is Quakers Hill Public School, opened in 1912. Two other public primary schools (Barnier and Hambledon) were opened in the 1990s to cope with suburb's growing population. High schools in Quakers Hill are split between Quakers Hill High School, catering to Years 7–12, and Wyndham College, years 11–12. There is also a Catholic primary school (Mary Immaculate) and high school (Terra Sancta College). Post-secondary education is serviced by Nirimba TAFE College and the University of Western Sydney, Blacktown Campus. Four of these facilities (UWS, Nirimba TAFE, Wyndham and St John Paul II) are located together in the Nirimba Education Precinct.

Demographics 

Quakers Hill has become a fairly populated suburb, experiencing major growth in recent years. In 1991, the population was approximately 14,630 (1991 ABS Census) and in 1996, the population had grown by more than 4,000 people to 18,759 (1996 ABS Census). By 2006, the population of Quakers Hill had risen to 25,015. The 2016 ABS Census recorded a further increase to 27,080 people.

In the 2016 ABS Census, the majority of people from Quakers Hill were born in Australia (58.0%). The second top response was India (10.4%). Most people identified as having an Australian ancestry (19%), followed by English (18%).

Most people from Quakers Hill identified as Catholic in 2016 (30.3%), followed by No Religion (15.5%).

Notable residents
Mel McLaughlin, Australian sports journalist
Fabrice Lapierre, Australian long jumper
Miracle, Australian hip hop artist
Aaron Mooy, Australian footballer for the Socceroos and Celtic
Michael Clifford, Australian guitarist in the band 5 Seconds of Summer
Matthew Norman convicted drug smuggler and member of the Bali nine

See also
 Quakers Hill Press
 Casefile True Crime Podcast – Case 6 (for details of the fire and trial)

References

External links 
 Casefile True Crime Podcast – Case 06: Roger Dean – 13 February 2016
 Revised suburb boundary of Quakers Hill (November 2020) - Blacktown City Council

Suburbs of Sydney
City of Blacktown